Mummel is a locality in the Goulburn Mulwaree Council, New South Wales, Australia. It lies about 23 km northwest of Goulburn and 110 km northeast of Canberra.

Various state schools were located in or near Mummel between 1868 and 1959. One school was established as Mummell Provisional School in October 1868, but was renamed Pomeroy school in January 1876. It was closed in 1915. An apparently different school called Mummell Public School was established in January 1870, but changed its name to Merrilla Public School also in January 1876. It closed in September 1927. Mummell (east) or Mummell East school was established in May 1870 and closed in December 1936. Mummell Lower school was established in January 1938 and closed in March 1959.

References

Goulburn Mulwaree Council
Localities in New South Wales
Southern Tablelands